Jonathan Segal is a film director and producer, known for The Last Run (2004), Norman (2010) and Ripple (1995).

References

External links 
 

Year of birth missing (living people)
Living people
American film directors